Júlia Koroknai (born 11 April 1981), known by her stage name Mya Diamond, is a Hungarian erotic model and former pornographic actress. In 2006 she won the Ninfa Award for best actress.

Biography
Diamond, born in Marcali, Hungary, has two younger siblings, a sister and a brother, with her sister being 17 years younger. She grew up in Marcali, which is a little city near Balaton. She spent a lot of time with her grandparents. She says, "They will stay always in my heart." The most important thing in Mya Diamond's life has always been and still is her family.

In school, she was mostly interested in languages. She loved English and German, so she did the intermediate exam when she was 14 years old. Mya eventually won first place in a contest for German language in Hungary. When she finished secondary school, she began studying in University and was working in a hotel at the same time. As a part-time job, she did some fashion modelling. Several months later, she was offered to work as a model in the pornographic business. She is famous for her foot fetish scenes.

She retired of porn movies in 2010 and doing performance on stage until 2014.

Awards and nominations

References

External links

 
 
 
 
 

1981 births
21st-century Hungarian actresses
Hungarian female adult models
Hungarian pornographic film actresses
Living people
People from Marcali